An arm is an upper limb of the body.

Arm or ARM may also refer to:

Geography
 Arm, Mississippi, an unincorporated community in Lawrence County, Mississippi
 Arm (geography), a narrow stretch of a larger body of water
 Distributary or arm, a subsidiary branch of a river
 Arm River (disambiguation), several rivers and locations
 "Arm of Finland" (Suomen käsivarsi), widely known geographical nickname for the municipality of Enontekiö
 County Armagh, Northern Ireland, Chapman code ARM
 Armenia (ISO 3166-1 alpha-3 country code)

Science and medicine
 Eta Capricorni or Arm, a binary star
 Anorectal malformation, a birth defect in which the rectum is malformed
 Artificial rupture of membranes, a method of stimulating childbirth
 Aldo-keto reductase family 1, member A1, enzyme
 Lever arm

Technology
 Asteroid Redirect Mission, a proposed NASA mission
 Atmospheric Radiation Measurement, a program of the United States Department of Energy
Advanced Robotics for Manufacturing, a consortium established in 2017

Computing
 ARM architecture family, a RISC instruction set family
 Arm (company), a British multinational company that designs the ARM computer processors
 Application Response Measurement, an open standard for diagnosing performance bottlenecks
 Abstract rewriting machine, a virtual machine
 Arm (software), a CLI status monitor for Tor

Weaponry
 Armaments or weapon, any device used with intent to inflict damage or harm
 Firearm, a portable gun
 Anti-radiation missile, a missile designed to detect and home in on an enemy radio emission source

Fiction
 ARM (novella), a novella by Larry Niven
 Amalgamated Regional Militia, a fictional group from Larry Niven's Known Space universe
 Armageddon (MUD) or Arm, a text-based online role-playing game
 ARM, a faction in Chris Taylor's video game Total Annihilation

Organizations
 Animal Rights Militia, a banner used by animal rights activists
 African Resistance Movement, an anti-apartheid movement in South Africa
 Afrikaner Weerstandsbeweging
 Army of the Republic of Macedonia
 Association of Radical Midwives, a UK organisation for midwives
 Associação dos Radioamadores de Macau, an amateur radio organization in Macao
 Asociația Radioamatorilor din Moldova, an amateur radio organization in Moldova
 Association of Railway Museums, an organization in North America
 Association of Recovering Motorcyclists, an international motorcycle association
 Australian Republican Movement, a lobby group that promotes changing Australia to a republic
 Autism rights movement, a social movement

Other uses
 Arm (dominoes), a line of dominoes with one open end
 Armenian language (ISO 639-2 code)
 Adjustable-rate mortgage, a type of mortgage loan
 Argentine peso moneda nacional (ISO 4217 code), a former currency of Argentina
 Armada República Mexicana, a ship prefix of the Mexican Navy
 American Racing Manual, a publication covering Thoroughbred horse racing in the United States
 Armidale Airport, IATA airport code "ARM"

See also
 List of ARM microarchitectures
 Arms (disambiguation)